John Brodie (born 8 September 1947) is an English former footballer who played as a full-back for Whitley Bay, Carlisle United, Bradford Park Avenue, Port Vale, and Northwich Victoria.

Career

Carlisle United
Brodie played for Whitley Bay, before joining Carlisle United in 1967. The "Cumbrians" finished tenth and 12th in the Second Division in 1967–68 and 1968–69 under the stewardship of first Tim Ward and then Bob Stokoe. Brodie only played nine league games during his time at Brunton Park.

Bradford (Park Avenue)
He then joined Bradford Park Avenue, who went on to be relegated out of the Football League in 1969–70 after finishing bottom of the Fourth Division; they ended up in the Northern Premier League for the 1970–71 season. Brodie had played 43 Football League games at the Horsfall Stadium.

Port Vale
He was signed by Port Vale manager Gordon Lee for a £250 fee in January 1971. He became a regular in the team, building a reputation for his "hard tackling and reliability". He played 19 Third Division games in the latter half of the 1970–71 season. He played 37 league games in the 1971–72 campaign, and scored his first goal in the Football League on 4 September in a 2–1 win over Wrexham at the Racecourse Ground. He played 35 league and three FA Cup games in the 1972–73 season, and again scored against Wrexham, his goal being enough to send the "Valiants" through to the Third Round of the FA Cup with a 1–0 victory at Vale Park on 9 December. He featured 49 times in the 1973–74 campaign, retaining his place under new manager Roy Sproson. Remerkably, his third and final career goal came against Wrexham, as he provided Vale with another 1–0 win on 1 October. He featured 30 times in the 1974–75 season, however during a 3–1 defeat to Huddersfield Town at Leeds Road on 8 March he went into a "ruthless tackle" only to come out with a red card and a broken leg. During his recovery procedure he was loaned to Northwich Victoria in September 1975, returning to Vale the same month. He recovered by January 1976, and played 12 games at the end of the 1975–76 season before re-breaking his leg in a 3–0 defeat to Brighton & Hove Albion at the Goldstone Ground on 10 April. He managed to play three games in the 1976–77 season, but after breaking the same leg for a third time he decided to retire in April 1978. He was given a testimonial game for Port Vale in August 1979, in what turned out to be a goalless draw with Everton.

Career statistics
Source:

References

1947 births
Living people
Sportspeople from Ashington
Footballers from Northumberland
English footballers
Association football fullbacks
Whitley Bay F.C. players
Carlisle United F.C. players
Bradford (Park Avenue) A.F.C. players
Port Vale F.C. players
Northwich Victoria F.C. players
English Football League players
Northern Premier League players